Prochoreutis ussurica is a moth in the family Choreutidae. It was described by Aleksandr Sergeievich Danilevsky in 1969. It is found in Russia (Ussuri).

References

Prochoreutis
Moths described in 1969